Your Mama Don't Dance is an album by organist Charles Kynard which was recorded in 1973 and released on the Mainstream label.

Reception

Allmusic awarded the album 4 stars.

Track listing 
 "Superstition" (Stevie Wonder) - 4:44  
 "The World Is a Ghetto" (War) - 2:59
 "Momma Jive" (Richard Fritz) - 3:26  
 "I Got So Much Trouble" (Joe Quarterman) - 5:06  
 "Your Mama Don't Dance" (Kenny Loggins, Jim Messina) - 2:36  
 "Zambezi" (Fritz) - 5:34  
 "Summer Breeze" (Jim Seals, Dash Crofts) - 3:25  
 "You've Got It Bad Girl" (Stevie Wonder, Yvonne Wright) - 3:47

Personnel 
Charles Kynard - organ
James Kartchner, Jerry Rusch - trumpet
George Bohanon, David Roberts - trombone
Arthur Adams - guitar
Chuck Rainey - electric bass
Paul Humphrey, Raymond Pounds - drums
Richard Fritz - arranger, conductor

References 

Charles Kynard albums
1973 albums
Mainstream Records albums
Albums produced by Bob Shad